The 2012 Atlantic 10 Conference baseball tournament was held from May 23 through 26. The top six regular season finishers of the league's thirteen teams met in the double-elimination tournament at Jim Houlihan Park at Jack Coffey Field on the campus of Fordham University in the Bronx, New York. Second seed  won their first tournament championship and claimed the conference's automatic bid to the 2012 NCAA Division I baseball tournament.

Seeding and format
The top six finishers from the regular season were seeded one through six based on conference winning percentage. The bottom four seeds played on the first day, with the losers of each game playing an elimination game in game 3. On day 2, the winners of games 1 and 2 played the top two seeds. Higher seeds were protected by playing lower seeds or playing later elimination games. Saint Louis claimed the top seed over Dayton and UMass claimed the fourth seed over Richmond by tiebreaker.

Results

All-Tournament Team
The following players were named to the All-Tournament Team.

Richmond's Jacob Mayers, also selected in 2011, was a second-time selection.

Most Valuable Player
Burny Mitchem was named Tournament Most Valuable Player. Mitchem was a senior pitcher for Dayton, who earned a pair of saves including in the 3–0 final over Richmond.

References

Tournament
Atlantic 10 Conference Baseball Tournament
Atlantic 10 Conference baseball tournament
Atlantic 10 Conference baseball tournament
2010s in the Bronx
Baseball in New York City
College sports in New York City
Sports competitions in New York City
Sports in the Bronx